Eric MacKenzie may refer to:
 Eric MacKenzie (politician) (born 1938), politician in New Brunswick, Canada
 Eric Francis MacKenzie (1893–1969), Roman Catholic bishop
 Eric Mackenzie (footballer) (born 1988), Australian rules footballer for West Coast Eagles
 Eric Mackenzie (baseball) (born 1932), retired Canadian Major League baseball player
 Eric McKenzie (1910–1994), Australian cricketer
 Eric McKenzie (cyclist) (born 1958), New Zealand cyclist